Cinereous is a colour, meaning ashy grey in appearance, either consisting of or resembling ashes, or a grey colour tinged with coppery brown.  It is derived from the Latin cinereus, from cinis (ashes).

The first recorded use of cinereous as a colour name in English was in 1661.

Cinereous in nature
Birds

 The colour name cinereous is used especially in the names of birds with ash grey plumage with a slight coppery brown tinge, including the cinereous antshrike (Thamnomanes caesius), cinereous becard (Pachyramphus rufus), cinereous bunting (Emberiza cineracea), cinereous conebill (Conirostrum cinereum), cinereous finch (Piezorhina cinerea), cinereous ground-tyrant (Muscisaxicola cinereus), cinereous harrier (Circus cinereus), cinereous mourner (Laniocera hypopyrra), cinereous-breasted spinetail (Synallaxis hypospodia), cinereous tinamou (Crypturellus cinereus), cinereous tyrant (Knipolegus striaticeps), cinereous vulture (Aegypius monachus), and cinereous warbling-finch (Poospiza cinerea).
 However, the colours of these birds may be brighter to the birds themselves since birds are tetrachromats and can see colours in the ultraviolet range that are invisible to humans, who are trichromats.

See also
 Animal colouration
 List of colours

References

External links

 The Free Dictionary

Shades of brown
Shades of gray
Bird colours